Wayne P. Armstrong (aka "Mr. Wolffia") is a natural historian, author, photographer and creator of the extensive online natural history textbook, Wayne's Word: An Online Textbook Of Natural History.

He was a professor of botany at Palomar College, now adjunct professor. He is an expert on the flora of North San Diego County. He wrote the section on Lemnaceae (syn. Araceae) in the revised Jepson Manual. He specializes in the macrophotography of unusual and obscure plants and animals.

Early life and career
For 40 years he taught courses in general biology, general botany, plants, people and plant identification. He is also author of the popular natural history website called Wayne's Word: An Online Textbook Of Natural History, including four decades of lecture material placed on blackboards and whiteboards during his teaching career. He has studied and photographed duckweeds extensively in California (subfamily Lemnoideae), including the world's-smallest flowering plants, and wrote the duckweed section for The Jepson Manual: Vascular Plants of California (2nd edition). His articles and photo images have appeared in more than 240 natural history publications.

Armstrong's special areas of interest include: the taxonomy of duckweeds, lichen symbiosis, the fig and its symbiotic wasp, drift seeds and fruits that float across oceans, botanical jewelry and the coconut pearl hoax, poison oak immune response, amazing plants (botanical record-breakers), California floristics (including Brodiaeas in California), and the evolution and adaptations of organisms. He wrote a master's thesis on Cupressus.

Although primarily a botanist, he has once again focused his attention on ant diversity, his childhood passion.

He is a professor emeritus in the Life Sciences Department at Palomar College, San Marcos, California.

References

External links 
 Wayne's Word: An Online Textbook of Natural History
 Bibliography of Wayne P. Armstrong
 Biography of Wayne P. Armstrong
 Peer Review & Correspondence of Wayne P. Armstrong
 Online Key to Duckweeds (Lemnoideae) by Wayne P. Armstrong
 Some Popular Online Articles by Wayne P. Armstrong

American biologists
Living people
Year of birth missing (living people)